WPOZ (88.3 MHz) is a non-commercial, listener-supported FM radio station licensed to Orlando, and serving Central Florida.  It is owned by the Central Florida Educational Foundation, Inc., and it broadcasts a Contemporary Christian radio format.  The radio studios are in Altamonte Springs.

WPOZ has an effective radiated power (ERP) of 100,000 watts.  The transmitter is in Bithlo, Florida.  WPOZ is simulcast on several other stations in Central Florida.  The station broadcasts using HD Radio technology.  There are other Christian music formats on WPOZ's three digital subchannels, which feed several FM translators in Central Florida.

History
On , the station signed on.  The call sign at the beginning was WEAZ and the city of license was Union Park, Florida.  The owner was the Central Florida Educational Foundation and the studios were on Lake Brantley Road in Altamonte Springs.

In 1998, the call letters switched to WPOZ, to stand for "Positive Hits," in contrast to the secular Top 40 charts.  The city of license later changed to Orlando.

Frequencies
In addition to 88.3 MHz, this station also broadcasts on other frequencies in different areas of Central Florida:

WPOZ, WMYZ and WHYZ also broadcast in HD Radio.

In late 2008, WPOZ was granted authorization by the U.S. Federal Communications Commission (FCC) to increase its signal strength to 100,000 watts; this was accomplished when the Central Florida Educational Foundation acquired a station in Lecanto, Florida, WLMS, from the Roman Catholic Diocese of Saint Petersburg. As that station also broadcast on 88.3 FM, Central Florida Educational Foundation closed down WLMS, enabling WPOZ to increase its signal strength without interfering with that station. After the upgrade, WPOZ's main signal would sufficiently cover areas already served by some of its repeaters, making them redundant.  Those were moved into Orlando to rebroadcast the HD offerings.

WPOZ had a repeater in Daytona Beach, WEAZ 88.1 MHz, licensed to Holly Hill; this station signed on in 1995 as WANX, becoming a simulcast of WPOZ as WEAZ in 1998. The station signed off permanently in December 2008, and its license was soon cancelled, following WPOZ's power increase that made this rebroadcaster redundant. On its website, it was announced that it had moved WMYZ 88.7 from Clermont to The Villages/Ocala, with listeners in that area redirected to 88.3.

WPOZ & WHYZ HD2
WPOZ-HD2, WHYZ-HD2, and WHGV broadcast a Christian rhythmic contemporary format as Hot 95.9; for those without HD radio receivers, it is heard on the following translators:

WMYZ HD2
WMYZ-HD2 broadcasts a Christian oldies format as "Z Rewind.com"; it is also heard on the following translator:

WPOZ HD3
WPOZ-HD3 broadcasts an urban gospel format as GPraise; this station also relays to the following translators:

WPOZ, WHYZ, and WMYZ  HD4
WPOZ-HD4 used to broadcast a Christian rock format as 103.7 The Rock and had a low-powered repeater in Clermont, W279CT.

W240BV, W273CA and W292DZ used to be low-powered repeaters that rebroadcast WPOZ in the Lake County area but were moved to Orlando.

As of October 2018, W273CA has since taken back control by Central Florida Educational Foundation following the expiration of the lease with iHeartMedia in September 2018. It now broadcasts a Spanish Christian contemporary format, following a stint with 1950s/60s oldies two days prior to the launch of "La Z 102.5" via WPOZ-HD4.

References

External links
https://julieroys.com/staffers-tell-toxic-culture-orlando-christian-radio-station/
 Hot 95.9 FM
 G Praise
 Z Rewind
 La Z 102.5
 The Rock HD

POZ
Contemporary Christian radio stations in the United States
Radio stations established in 1995
1995 establishments in Florida
POZ